The Billboard Social 50 is a popularity chart which ranks the most active musical artists on the world's leading social networking services. Its data, published by Billboard magazine and compiled by Next Big Sound, is based collectively on each artist's weekly additions of friends, fans and followers, along with artist website views and streaming media. Bill Werde, the former editorial director of Billboard, called the Social 50 "yet another step" in the evolution of the magazine and an "important response to our changing times". The chart initially only retrieved its data from YouTube, Vevo, Facebook, Twitter, Myspace, and iLike to create its ranking, but in November 2012 was expanded to include SoundCloud and Instagram. Data from Vine and Tumblr were added to the chart in June 2015.

The Billboard Social 50 was launched on December 11, 2010. The first artist to reach number one on the chart was Barbadian singer Rihanna. Since debuting, she has spent a total of 21 weeks at the top of the chart. In October 2016, South Korean boy band BTS landed the number one spot on the chart, becoming the second K-pop act, after Psy, to reach first place on the ranking. They hold the record for the most weeks at number one, with 210. Canadian singer-songwriter Justin Bieber follows with 164 weeks at number one. BTS also hold the record for the most consecutive weeks at number one, with 180. Following her death in December 2012, American singer Jenni Rivera became the first and only artist to top the chart posthumously. Since its launch, 20 artists have reached the top spot on the Billboard Social 50. Three of these artists—Rivera, Skrillex and Justin Timberlake—have only reached the spot for a single week.

On December 26, 2020, Billboard announced its suspension of the Social 50 chart for an undisclosed period of time in order to facilitate their transition to a new data partner. While this would also impact the Artist 100 and Emerging Artists charts—both include social metrics in their formulation—Billboard stated that neither chart would be disrupted. The Social 50 was to resume activity sometime early in 2021, but remains inactive to date.

Number-one artists

See also 
 2010 in music
 2011 in music
 2012 in music
 2013 in music
 2014 in music
 2015 in music
 2016 in music
 2017 in music
 2018 in music
 2019 in music
 2020 in music

References 

Social 50 history

External links 
 at Billboard
 at Next Big Sound

United States Social 50
Social 50